The 2004 WNBA season was the seventh for the Washington Mystics. The franchise drafted Alana Beard as the 2nd pick in the 2004 WNBA Draft, who later led the team to the playoffs for the first time in two years.

The Mystics won a playoff game this season, something they would not again accomplish until 2013.

Additionally, the Mystics won a home playoff game. Washington would not win another home playoff game until 2017.

This would also be Chamique Holdsclaw's last year as a Mystic.

Dispersal Draft

Based on the Mystics' 2003 record, they would pick 2nd in the Cleveland Rockers dispersal draft. The Mystics picked Chasity Melvin.

WNBA Draft

Regular season

Season standings

Season schedule

Player stats

References

Washington Mystics seasons
Washington
Washington Mystics